Ste24 endopeptidase is an enzyme. This enzyme catalyses the following chemical reaction

 The peptide bond hydrolysed can be designated -C-aaX in which C is an S-isoprenylated cysteine residue, a is usually aliphatic and X is the C-terminal residue of the substrate protein, and may be any of several amino acids

This enzyme belongs to the peptidase family M48.

References

External links 
 

EC 3.4.24